Daute was one of nine menceyatos guanches (native kingdoms) that was divided the island of Tenerife (Spain) after the death of King Tinerfe, in the period before the conquest of the islands by the Crown of Castile. 

Occupied by the extension of the existing municipalities of El Tanque, Los Silos, Buenavista del Norte and Santiago del Teide and menceys were Cocanaymo and Romen.

References

External links 
 Menceyatos de Tenerife

Daute
Former kingdoms